The Brisbane Lions' 1999 season was its third in the Australian Football League (AFL).

Season summary

Premiership Season

Home and away season

Finals series

Ladder

References

Brisbane Lions Season, 1999
Brisbane Lions seasons